is a third-generation Zainichi Korean former actor.

Career
Arai made his screen debut in Isao Yukisada's Go in 2001 when he was 22 years old. His next film role was the emotionally disturbed senior high school student Aoki in Toshiaki Toyoda's Blue Spring, which won him the Best New Actor award at the 17th Takasaki Film Festival.

In 2011, Arai co-starred as Detective Kazuhiko Soga in a one-off TV crime thriller Douki with co-stars Ryuhei Matsuda as Detective Ryota Udagawa and Chiaki Kuriyama as Michiru Soga.

The June 2012 issue of Switch, a Japanese arts and media magazine, features a special segment on top ten manga that teaches love and passion, chosen by Japanese actors, artists and musicians including Arai, who chose Bakuman while explaining: "You should up your girl power by learning how to behave like a heroine."

Arai was represented by Anore Inc., a talent agency founded in 1996 by actor Tadanobu Asano, Asano's father Yukihisa Sato and Asano's musician brother Kujun Sato.

The talent agency terminated his contract shortly after Arai's arrest on February 1, 2019.

Personal life
Arai's birth name is Park Kyung-sik (박경식). He had stated in a number of Japanese interviews that he has a continual interest in being involved with films that explore Korean-Japanese issues. 

Tokyograph announced in 2007 that Arai entered a "serious relationship" with singer Miu Sakamoto, the eldest daughter of noted musician Ryuichi Sakamoto and singer-songwriter Akiko Yano, after meeting during a television talk show in 2006.

Arrest 
On February 1, 2019, Arai was arrested for sexual assault involving rape of an outcall masseuse on July 1, 2018 by the Tokyo Metropolitan Police Department. On February 21, 2019, he was indicted by the Tokyo District Public Prosecutors Office. On December 2, 2019, Arai was sentenced to five years in prison.

On December 25, 2019, Arai's lawyer requested bail from the Tokyo District Court. On December 27, the Tokyo District Court decided to grant bail, and Arai paid a bail deposit of 5 million yen.

On November 17, 2020, the sentence was reduced to four years in prison due to the actor paying a settlement of 3 million yen (about US$29,000) to the victim.

Filmography

Film

Television

 Penance (2012)
 Going My Home (2012)
 Hitori Shizuka Ep.2 (2012)
 Secret Honeymoon (2012)
 Makyo Onsen: Hito o sagashite (2012)
 Kuroi Junin no Kuroki Hitomi (Ep. Kuroi Hakui no Onna)  (2012)
 The Locked Room Murders Ep.5 (2012)
 Kaitakusha-tachi (2012)
 Shokuzai Last ep. (2012)
 Hakuba no Ōji-sama Junai Tekireiki (2013)
 Taberudake (2013)
 Radio (2013)
 Shoten'in Michiru no Mi no ue Banashi (2013)
 Mahoro Ekimae Bangaichi Ep.5 (2013)
 Nobunaga Concerto (2014)
 64: Rokuyon (2015)
 I'm Home (2015)
 Do Konjo Gaeru (2015) 
 Ichiban Densha ga Hashitta (2015)
 Shitamachi Rocket (2015), Keiji Tomiyama
 Aka Medaka (2015)
 Sanada Maru (2016), Katō Kiyomasa
 Indigo no Koibito (2016), Kenji Harada
 Busujima Yuriko no Sekirara Nikki (2016, Shōta Ozu
 Totto TV (2016), Rokusuke Ei
 Haikei, Minpaku-sama (2016), Kanta Yamashita
 Kidnap Tour (2016)
 Midnight Diner: Tokyo Stories (2016)
 Shukatsu Kazoku: Kitto, Umaku Iku (2017), Kota Kunihara
 Innocent Days (2018)

References

External links
Official agency page 

1979 births
Living people
People from Hirosaki
South Korean expatriates in Japan
South Korean male film actors
South Korean people convicted of rape
Zainichi Korean people